Djinn is the  second full-length album by the black metal band Melechesh, and their first on Osmose Productions. A video for Genies, Sorcerers and Mesopotamian Nights was made, using an abridged version. Also note that the song "The Siege of Lachish" is actually 6 minutes and 21 seconds long; after an extended period of silence, a Mesopotamian chant played in reverse starts at 9:32.

Track listing

Personnel
Ashmedi: Vocals, Rhythm and Lead Guitars, Synthesizers
Moloch: Rhythm and Lead Guitars, Buzuq, Vovals
Al' Hazred: Bass, Backing Vocals
Proscriptor: Drums, Percussion

Production
Executive Producer: Osmose Productions
Arranged and Produced by Melechesh
Recorded by Eric DeBoer and Henry Weiring
Mixed by Eric DeBoer, Harry Weiring and Ashmedi
Masrered by Kol Marshall and Proscriptor McGovdern. 
 Christophe Szpajdel — logo

References
 
 

2001 albums
Melechesh albums